"Missionary Man" is a song by British pop duo Eurythmics from their fifth studio album, Revenge (1986). The song features Jimmy Zavala on harmonica and Joniece Jamison on backing vocals.

In the band's native United Kingdom, it was the fourth single to be taken from the album and peaked at number 31 on the UK Singles Chart. It was more successful in the United States, where it was the first single to be taken from the album and peaked at number 14 on the Billboard Hot 100 (their last main US top-20 entry to date). It also made the top 10 of the Billboard Hot Dance/Club Play chart, and it received extensive airplay on American rock radio, reaching number one on the Billboard Album Rock Tracks chart, Eurythmics' only song to top this chart. The single also peaked at number nine in Australia, where it was released as the album's second single.

"Missionary Man" earned Eurythmics a 1986 Grammy Award for Best Rock Performance by a Duo or Group with Vocal. The video received heavy airplay on MTV and received five nominations at the 1987 MTV Video Music Awards.

Background
Upon the single's July 1986 US release, the song was described as being inspired in part by Lennox's 1984–1985 marriage to devout Hare Krishna Radha Raman. When discussing the song's inspiration and meaning, Lennox stated "Obviously, there is a personal meaning in [Missionary Man] for me, because of my past history. But I also think that there are a great deal of people in the media, in the form of politicians or religious speakers or philosophical people, people who are generally trying to have some power over other people, who I just don't trust."

Music video

Directed by Willy Smax, the music video for Missionary Man featured stop-animation techniques similar to those used in Peter Gabriel's "Sledgehammer" video from earlier in 1986. The video received heavy play from MTV and received five nominations at the 1987 MTV Video Music Awards.

Track listings
 UK 7-inch single
A. "Missionary Man" (7-inch version) – 3:50
B. "The Last Time" (live at The Roxy in Los Angeles)

 UK 12-inch single
A. "Missionary Man" (extended version) – 6:55
B. "The Last Time" (live at The Roxy in Los Angeles)

 US 7-inch single
A. "Missionary Man" (7-inch version) – 3:50
B. "Take Your Pain Away" (LP version) – 4:37

 US 12-inch single
A. "Missionary Man" (extended version) – 6:55
B. "Take Your Pain Away" (LP version) – 4:37

Charts

Weekly charts

Year-end charts

Release history

References

1986 songs
1986 singles
Eurythmics songs
RCA Records singles
Songs written by Annie Lennox
Songs written by David A. Stewart
Song recordings produced by Dave Stewart (musician and producer)